The Flying House, known in Japan as , is a Christian anime television series produced by Tatsunoko Productions broadcast between April 1982 and March 1983 on TV Tokyo, and distributed by the Christian Broadcasting Network in the United States. In 2010, the Christian Broadcasting Network made the 52 episodes available for viewing online.

At the same time, CBN and Tatsunoko also produced a related series, Superbook.

In the Philippines, reruns of the show were broadcast on GMA Network in 1992 ZOE TV in 2000s and on ABS-CBN in 2015. The episodes are currently broadcast on Pop Life TV via digital free-to-air television BEAM TV.  It was also broadcast on the Australian Christian Channel in Australia. Also It aired  on TBN UK & Ireland In United Kingdom and Ireland.

Plot

The series begins at the middle of a game of hide and seek, as a young boy named Justin Casey (Gen Adachi) finishes counting and begins searching for his friends, Angela "Angie" Roberts and her little brother Corwyn "Corky" Roberts (Kanna and Tsukubo Natsuyama). As he searches for Angie and Corky in a wooded area, a thunderstorm occurs. Justin manages to sneak up on the two before the rain starts pouring, forcing them to run for cover. They eventually find a spacecraft type house in the wooded area, previously unseen according to Justin. At first glance it appears that nobody is home, until they discover a clown-battery type android named Solar Ion Robot (Kadenchin), or S.I.R. for short. They soon meet the owner of the house, Professor Humphrey Bumble (Dr. Tokio Taimu), who introduces the children to his greatest creation, a half rocket, half house one of a kind time machine named The Flying House. Professor Bumble's attempt at recreating Benjamin Franklin's famous lightning experiment with the use of a bat looking kite flying outside the house to get the machine working leads to a temporary change in S.I.R.'s personality from being nice to mean and he goes berserk, before sending The Flying House in course to the past. Justin, Angie, Corky, and S.I.R. realize how long the journey back home will take due to Professor Bumble's misguidance and errors in time travel, but in the meantime they witness and participate (with little or no consequences) in numerous events of the Bible's New Testament, from the birth of John the Baptist to the rise of the Paul the Apostle. Eventually, they make it home exactly the same way they traveled into the past in the first place. S.I.R. gets a knock in the head which, again, makes him go from being nice to mean and go berserk and he attacks The Flying House. Ironically, S.I.R.'s berserkiness fixes it in such a way that it finally sends the whole crew back to their own time period, and the show ends, with S.I.R. changed back from being mean to nice by the end of the trip.

Cast and characters 
 Justin Casey (Billie Lou Watt): The best friend of Corky and Angie. His Japanese counterpart, Gen Adachi, is played by Satomi Majima.
 Angela "Angie" Roberts (Sonia Owens): Corky's older sister and Justin's best friend. Her Japanese counterpart, Kanna Natsuyama, is played by Sanae Takagi.
 Corwyn "Corky" Roberts (Helena Van Koert): Angie's little brother and Justin's best friend. His Japanese counterpart, Tsukubo Natsuyama, is played by Runa Akiyama.
 Professor Humphrey Bumble (Hal Studer): The inventor of the Flying House and S.I.R.. His Japanese counterpart, Dr.Tokio Taimu, is played by Yoshito Yasuhara .
 Solar Ion Robot / S.I.R. (Ray Owens): Justin's, Angie's, and Corky's best friend, and Professor Bumble's clown-type robotic assistant. His Japanese counterpart, Kandenchin, is played by Kyōko Tongū.

Episode list

Season 1 (1982)

Season 2 (1983)

 Well, Well, Well? - Jesus meets a Samaritan woman at the well and promises her the gift of living water.
 Left Holding the Bag - Jesus heals a paralytic man on the pool of Bethesda during the Sabbath Day. 
 Who Among You? - A Pharisee asks Jesus a question with regards to the stoning of an adulteress. Jesus and the woman taken in adultery
 Oil and Water - Jesus sends his 12 disciples in pairs to preach the word of God and to perform miracles.
 A Special Secret - The Transfiguration and Jesus heals an epileptic boy.
 Midnight Callers - Jesus teaches, "Ask and you shall receive. Seek and you shall find. Knock and the door will be opened to you." Jesus tells the parable of The Ten Maidens.
 What's it worth? - Jesus tells the Parable of the Sower.
 Fruitless - Jesus tells the parables of The Weeds and The Wicked Tenants.
 Fit For a King - Jesus enters the city of Jerusalem.
 The Secret Agent - Jesus cleanses the temple by driving the merchants out of the temple.
 The Preparation - Mary of Bethany washes Jesus' feet with an alabaster box of expensive perfume and Jesus heals a blind man.
 Betrayed -  Jesus washes the apostles' feet. Jesus and his twelve disciples are in the Last Supper. Jesus prays in the Garden of Gethsemane and Judas Iscariot betrays Jesus, sending him to Caiaphas.
 Who's in Charge - Jesus is presented to Caiaphas, to King Herod Antipas, and to Pontius Pilate. Peter betrays Jesus by denying him thrice and the cock crows.
 The Crown of Thorns - Jesus is scourged at the pillar and put with a crown of thorns. Pilate frees Barabbas and sentenced Jesus to death by crucifixion.
 Golgotha - Jesus carries his cross towards Golgotha and Simon of Cyrene is compelled to carry the cross before Jesus. Jesus is crucified, died, and buried.
 The Empty Tomb - Jesus' tomb is empty and Jesus is risen.
 With You Always - Jesus appears as himself to two of his disciples in the road towards Emmaus. Seven of the disciples catch 153 fish and Jesus restored Peter. Jesus ascends to heaven. 
 The Prison Break - An angel helps Peter escape from prison.
 Good Riddance - The death of King Herod.
 The Blinding Light - Stephen is stoned and died. Jesus appears to Saul and is converted from being a persecutor of the believers to becoming an apostle of Christ.
 Bound & Rebound - Saul, who is now called Paul, preaches the word of God in Macedonia and delivers a woman from an evil spirit. Paul and Silas are flogged in public and placed in prison, yet a severe earthquake occurred while they are in prison.
 Tender Grapes - Paul interferes in a mob and helps a man get justice.
 Shipwrecked - Paul is shipwrecked in the island of Malta.
 Snake Bite - Paul is bitten by a snake but does not die and he heals a young girl from a severe illness.
 Heartbreak - The story of Onesimus, the slave of Philemon.
 Homeward Bound - Paul writes Philemon to take back Onesimus, who is baptized and converted as a follower of Christ. The Flying House finally returns to the 20th century after its treks through the times of Ancient Israel.

Home video and syndication
The Flying House was available on VHS by Tyndale; all 52 episodes were released over 26 VHS cassettes. A DVD volume of The Flying House was released by Vision Video in 2006, featuring the first four episodes. In 2010, the Christian Broadcasting Network made the 52 episodes available for viewing online.  The series also airs on the Trinity Broadcasting Network (TBN) and its children's subchannel Smile.

Other titles
 Arabic: المنزل الطائر
 Arabic (Islamic): المنزل الطائر
 French: La maison volante
 Korean: 타임교실 톤데라하우스의 대모험 
 German: Fliegendes Haus (Flying House; aired on Bibel TV)
 Spanish: La casa voladora
 Chinese: 飞行之家
 Russian: Летающий дом 
 Ukrainian: Літаючий будинок 
 Romanian: Casa Zburătoare 
 Danish: Det Flyvende Hus 
 Hungarian: A repülő ház 
 Mongolian:  Нисдэг байшин
 Hebrew:  הבית המעופף 
 Portuguese: A Casa Voadora
 Italian: Il Vangelo per i bambini ("The Gospel for children")
 Finnish: Lentävä talo
 Turkish: Uçan ev
 Czech: Létající dům

See also
 Superbook
 In the Beginning: The Bible Stories
 The Greatest Adventure: Stories from the Bible

References

External links
The Flying House episodes viewable online at CBN.com

1982 anime television series debuts
Animated television series about children
Children's education television series
Christian animation
Christian children's television series
Christianity in Japan
Cultural depictions of John the Baptist
Tatsunoko Production
Trinity Broadcasting Network original programming
Television series based on the Bible
TV Tokyo original programming
Japanese time travel television series
Caiaphas
Cultural depictions of Pontius Pilate